Metal Kombat for the Mortal Man is the debut studio album by video game metal/power metal band Powerglove released October 31, 2007. The album contains cover versions of music from various video games, similar to their previous release, Total Pwnage.

The album was recorded in various locations and mixed at the band's home studio.

Track listing
All songs arranged and remixed by Powerglove.

Personnel

 Chris Marchiel — guitar
 Alex Berkson — guitar
 Nick Avila — bass
 Bassil Silver-Hajo — drums
 Mixed by Bassil Silver-Hajo and Powerglove.
 Produced and Engineered by Powerglove.
 Matt Pigott: Guitar Solo on "Holy Orders," Synth Programming on "So Sexy Robotnik" and "Metal Kombat."
 Synths by Alex Berkson and Powerglove.
 Simon Jeker: Saxophone on "So Sexy Robotnik"
 Minor Key Transposition on "Mario Minor" by S.S.H.
 Powergirl, Front and Back Cover Art by Dave Rapoza
 Zebediah Portrait, Sprites and Layout by Chris Marchiel

References

2007 debut albums
Powerglove (band) albums